Arthur J. Rooney Athletic Field, commonly known as simply Rooney Field, is a 2,200-seat (4,500 capacity) multi-purpose facility in Pittsburgh, Pennsylvania. Situated on the campus of Duquesne University, Rooney Field  is the home field of the Duquesne Dukes football, soccer and lacrosse teams.

Its location atop the Bluff in the center of Duquesne's campus makes Rooney Field one of the most unusual football facilities in the nation. Bordered by Academic Walk on one side and Mellon Hall of Science and the Duquesne Towers Living and Learning Center on either end, the field offers scenic views of downtown Pittsburgh, the Monongahela River, and Pittsburgh's South Side.

Rooney Field has enjoyed the national spotlight as the host of three televised games. On Monday, October 31, 1994, ESPN2 televised Duquesne's 16–12 win over Iona College to a national audience. In addition, two games in 1995 — the MAAC Championship-deciding game versus St. John's and the ECAC Bowl game vs. Wagner — were aired locally on  what was then the e Sports Network.

Description
The 1993 completion of Rooney Field enabled the Dukes to play football on campus for the first time since 1929. A  excavation transformed what was once a faculty and staff parking lot into the centerpiece of Duquesne University's urban campus. The space limitations inherent to the university's  plot required that Rooney Field be one of the few in college football that run east to west.

The Beard Press Box, a three-tier structure funded by a contribution from the Eugene Beard family, was completed in the summer of 1995. The field itself is named for Duquesne alumnus and founder of the Pittsburgh Steelers, Art Rooney.  Prior to the University of Pittsburgh Medical Center Sportsplex opening in 2000, the field and other university facilities served as either the primary or secondary in-season training facilities for the Steelers since their founding in 1933.

In addition to serving as home for the Duquesne men's and women's soccer and lacrosse teams, numerous other activities are held on Rooney Field. Various camps, team practices, and intramural activities keep the field in constant use.

With a capacity of only 2,200 fans, Rooney Field is currently the smallest stadium in the NCAA FCS.

Renovations
Bolstered by the first half of a $4 million renovation completed in 2009, the lighted, Sportexe turf-covered facility celebrates its 20th full-season anniversary in 2013.

Part of the recently completed renovation is permanent grandstand seating on Bluff Street, which replaces temporary bleachers that had been installed for 14 football seasons. Permanent concession stands and restrooms have also been added to the south side of the field. The Academic Walk sideline has also gained additional seating. As part of the second stage of the renovation, the field house located at the east end of the field was remodeled and expanded to provide an area for a new football locker room, football coaches' suite, and additional locker room space for the soccer, lacrosse, and swim teams. Field house construction began following the 2008–2009 athletics season and was finished in the summer of 2011.  The 2009 renovation reduced the field's capacity from 4,500 to the current 2,200 although plans are being developed for a future renovation that may re-add additional seating.

See also
 List of NCAA Division I FCS football stadiums

References

External links
Rooney Field - Duquesne University Department of Athletic

College football venues
Duquesne Dukes football
Culture of Pittsburgh
Sports venues in Pittsburgh
American football venues in Pennsylvania
Sports venues completed in 1993
1993 establishments in Pennsylvania